The Worker Rights Consortium (WRC) is an independent labor rights monitoring organization focused on protecting the rights of workers who sew apparel and make other products sold in the United States, particularly those bearing college or university logos. The WRC was founded in 2000 by student activists including members of United Students Against Sweatshops.

References

External links 
Worker Rights Consortium (homepage)
Brand Responsibility Project Records 2004-2012.0.84 cubic feet (2 boxes) of textual materials plus 83.8 GB of digital files.

Political advocacy groups in the United States
Consortia in the United States
2001 establishments in the United States
Organizations established in 2001
Workers' rights organizations based in the United States